Valdemar Jiruš (born September 9, 1973 in Kolín, Czechoslovakia) is a Czech ice hockey coach and a former professional ice hockey player. He played defenceman for BK Mladá Boleslav in the Czech Extraliga in his final season. After the end of his playing career he coached the youth teams of HC Bílí Tygři Liberec. Since 2018 he has been assistant coach of HC Benátky nad Jizerou.

Career 
Jiruš started playing ice hockey in his hometown Kolín. Played with TJ Slovan Děčín and SK Kadaň (in the Czech First League and Czech Second League respectively) from 1994 to 2000. He spent the seasons 2001–2002 and 2002–2003 with Sparta Praha, and he won in this time the Extraliga in 2002. In 2003 Jiruš joined HC Liberec and left the club on April 25, 2009 after six-year to sign with BK Mladá Boleslav.

Career statistics

Notes

External links

Valdemar Jiruš on the official HC Liberec website

1973 births
BK Mladá Boleslav players
HC Bílí Tygři Liberec players
HC Sparta Praha players
Sportovní Klub Kadaň players
Czech ice hockey coaches
Living people
Czech ice hockey defencemen
Sportspeople from Kolín